Kriangkrai Chasang (born January 25, 1988) is a Thai professional footballer who plays as a defender.

Honours

Club
Bangkok United
 Thai League 1: 2006

External links
 Kriangkrai Chasang at Goal

1988 births
Living people
Kriangkrai Chasang
Kriangkrai Chasang
Association football defenders
Kriangkrai Chasang
Kriangkrai Chasang
Kriangkrai Chasang
Kriangkrai Chasang
Kriangkrai Chasang
Kriangkrai Chasang
Kriangkrai Chasang